Robert Leon Gruber Jr. (born June 7, 1958) is a former American football offensive tackle in the National Football League (NFL) who played for the Green Bay Packers, Cleveland Browns, Miami Dolphins, Washington Redskins, Los Angeles Rams. Gruber played collegiate ball for the University of Pittsburgh before being drafted by the Los Angeles Rams in the 10th round of the 1980 NFL Draft. He is a graduate of Greenville High School and is originally from Greenville, Pennsylvania. He has one daughter, Andrea Gruber, to his wife Deborah (deceased) He has two younger siblings, Pamela Redfoot and Brian Gruber.

References

1958 births
Living people
People from Del Rio, Texas
Players of American football from Texas
American football offensive tackles
Pittsburgh Panthers football players
Cleveland Browns players
Green Bay Packers players
Miami Dolphins players
Jacksonville Bulls players